Lepra is a genus of lichen-forming fungi in the family Pertusariaceae. Although the genus was created in 1777, it was not regularly used until it was resurrected in 2016 following molecular phylogenetic analyses. It has more than 80 species, most of which were previously classified in genus Pertusaria.

Taxonomy
The genus was originally circumscribed by Austrian naturalist Giovanni Antonio Scopoli in 1777. Martyn Dibben designated Lichen albescens (=Lepra albescens) as a neotype for the genus in 1980. In 2015, Kondratyuk and colleagues proposed the new genus Marfloraea to contain 13 members of the Variola group (one of four major clades identified in Pertusaria in the broad sense), with Marfloraea amara (=Lepra amara) selected as the type. The proposed genus was rejected a year later when Josef Hafellner and Ayşen Türk explained that the new genus name was superfluous because older available names existed that should have instead been used. Consequently, the genus Lepra was reinstated to contain species formerly placed in the Pertusaria albescens species group.

Description
Genus Lepra contains crustose lichens with the following features: disc-like ascomata; a hymenial gel that is weakly amyloid to non-amyloid; asci that are strongly amyloid but lack clear amyloid structures at their tips; and asci containing one or two single-layered, thin-walled ascospores.

Species

, Species Fungorum accepts 81 species of Lepra.
Lepra acroscyphoides 
Lepra albescens 
Lepra albopunctata 
Lepra alterimosa 
Lepra alticola 
Lepra amara 
Lepra amaroides 
Lepra andersoniae 
Lepra argentea  – Falkland Islands
Lepra arida  – Australia
Lepra asiana 
Lepra aspergilla 
Lepra austropacifica 
Lepra bambusetorum 
Lepra buloloensis 
Lepra caucasica 
Lepra clarkeana 
Lepra colorata 
Lepra commutata 
Lepra composita 
Lepra corallina 
Lepra corallophora 
Lepra dactylina 
Lepra dactylinella 
Lepra elatinica  – Australia
Lepra erubescens 
Lepra erythrella 
Lepra excludens 
Lepra flavovelata 
Lepra floridana 
Lepra graeca 
Lepra hengduanensis 
Lepra huangshanensis 
Lepra hypothamnolica 
Lepra isidioides 
Lepra lacericans 
Lepra laceromarginata 
Lepra leeuwenii  – Australia
Lepra leonina 
Lepra leucopsara 
Lepra leucosora 
Lepra leucosorodes 
Lepra lichexanthonorstictica  – Brazil
Lepra lijiangensis 
Lepra macloviana 
Lepra mammosa 
Lepra melanochlora 
Lepra miniatescens 
Lepra monogona 
Lepra multipuncta 
Lepra multipunctoides 
Lepra muricata 
Lepra neotriconica 
Lepra novae-zelandiae 
Lepra ocellata 
Lepra ophthalmiza 
Lepra ornatula 
Lepra panyrga 
Lepra parathalassica 
Lepra perlacericans  – Australia
Lepra pseudodactylina 
Lepra pseudolactea 
Lepra pseudosubventosa  – Bolivia
Lepra psoromica 
Lepra pulvinata 
Lepra pustulata 
Lepra roseola 
Lepra rugifera 
Lepra scaberula 
Lepra schaereri 
Lepra scutellifera 
Lepra setschwanica 
Lepra slesvicensis 
Lepra sordida 
Lepra sphaerophora 
Lepra stalactiza 
Lepra subcomposita 
Lepra subdactylina 
Lepra sublacerans 
Lepra submultipuncta 
Lepra subventosa 
Lepra superans 
Lepra teneriffensis 
Lepra thamnolica 
Lepra tibetensis 
Lepra trachythallina 
Lepra trichosa 
Lepra tropica 
Lepra truncata 
Lepra tuberculata 
Lepra umbricola 
Lepra variolina 
Lepra variolosa 
Lepra ventosa 
Lepra violacea 
Lepra waghornei 
Lepra wallamanensis 
Lepra wangii 
Lepra wawreana 
Lepra weii 
Lepra wulingensis 
Lepra xantholeuca

References

Pertusariales
Pertusariales genera
Lichen genera
Taxa described in 1777
Taxa named by Giovanni Antonio Scopoli